Mount Hyatt is a mountain in the southern part of the Latady Mountains, about  northwest of Schmitt Mesa, in Palmer Land, Antarctica.

References

Mountains of Palmer Land